A by-election was held for the New South Wales Legislative Assembly electorate of New England on 28 June 1862 because George Markham resigned, to be appointed superintendent for the southern district in the establishment of the Police Force.

Dates

Candidates

 Alfred Hayles was a one time candidate, a gold miner from Rocky River. 

 James Husband was a solicitor in Sydney and this was the only occasion on which he stood for election

 Robert Forster was a solicitor in Armidale.

 Thomas Rusden was a squatter in the Glen Innes region and a former member for Member for New England and Macleay.

Result

George Markham resigned.

See also
Electoral results for the district of New England
List of New South Wales state by-elections

References

1862 elections in Australia
New South Wales state by-elections
1860s in New South Wales